Anticrates zapyra is a moth of the Lacturidae family. It is known from Australia, including Queensland.

References

Zygaenoidea